The genus Aster (sunflower family - Asteraceae) is now generally restricted to the Old World species. The other species have now been reclassified as Afroaster, Almutaster, Canadanthus, Doellingeria, Eucephalus, Eurybia, Ionactis, Oligoneuron, Oreostemma, Sericocarpus and Symphyotrichum.

Aster synonyms 

 Aster abatus : Xylorhiza tortifolia
 Aster alpigenus ssp. alpigenus : Oreostemma alpigenum var. alpigenum
 Aster alpigenus ssp. andersonii : Oreostemma alpigenum var. andersonii 
 Aster ananthocladus : Afroaster ananthocladus 
 Aster adscendens : Symphyotrichum ascendens
 Aster bakerianus : Afroaster hispidus
 Aster bowiei : Afroaster bowiei
 Aster brachyactis : Symphyotrichum ciliatum 
 Aster breweri : Eucephalus breweri
 Aster brickellioides var. brickellioides : Eucephalus brickellioides
 Aster brickellioides var. glabratus : Eucephalus glabratus
 Aster caerulescens : Symphyotrichum praealtum var. praealtum  
 Aster campestris var. bloomeri : Symphyotrichum campestre var. bloomeri
 Aster campestris var. campestris : Symphyotrichum campestre var. campestre  
 Aster chilensis var. chilensis : Symphyotrichum chilense var. chilense
 Aster chilensis var. invenustum : Symphyotrichum chilense var. invenustum
 Aster chimanimaniensis : Afroaster chimanimaniensis
 Aster ciliolatus : Symphyotrichum ciliolatum
 Aster comptonii : Afroaster comptonii
 Aster confertifolius : Afroaster confertifolius 
 Aster cordifolius : Symphyotrichum cordifolium
 Aster dumosus L.: Symphyotrichum dumosum (L.) G. L. Nesom
 Aster eatonii : Symphyotrichum eatonii
 Aster elatus : Oreostemma elatum
 Aster engelmannii : Eucephalus engelmannii
 Aster ericoides : Symphyotrichum ericoides
 Aster erucifolius : Afroaster erucifolius
 Aster exilis : Symphyotrichum divaricatum  
 Aster falcatus var. crassulus : Symphyotrichum falcatum var. crassulum
 Aster falcatus var. falcatus : Symphyotrichum falcatum var. falcatum  
 Aster foliaceus var. apricus : Symphyotrichum foliaceum var. apricum
 Aster foliaceus var. foliaceus : Symphyotrichum foliaceum var. foliaceum
 Aster foliaceus var. lyallii : Symphyotrichum hendersonii
 Aster foliaceus var. parryi :  Symphyotrichum foliaceum var. parryi
 Aster frondosus : Symphyotrichum frondosum
 Aster glaucodes : Eurybia glauca
 Aster greatae : Symphyotrichum greatae
 Aster harveyanus : Afroaster serrulatus
 Aster integrifolius : Eurybia integrifolia
 Aster intricatus : Machaerantha carnosa var. intricata
 Aster laevis var. geyeri : Symphyotrichum laeve var. geyeri
 Aster laevis var. laevis : Symphyotrichum laeve var. laeve
 Aster lateriflorus var. lateriflorus : Symphyotrichum lateriflorum var. lateriflorum
 Aster lateriflorus var. pendulus : Symphyotrichum lateriflorum var. horizontale
 Aster ledophyllus : Eucephalus ledophyllus var. ledophyllus
 Aster linariifolius : Ionactis linariifolius
 Aster lydenburgensis : Afroaster lydenburgensis
 Aster milanjiensis : Afroaster milanjiensis 
 Aster modestus : Canadanthus modestus 
 Aster novae-angliae : Symphyotrichum novae-angliae
 Aster nubimontis : Afroaster nubimontis
 Aster occidentalis var. intermedius : Symphyotrichum spathulatum var. intermedium 
 Aster occidentalis var. occidentalis : Symphytorichum spathulatum var. spathulatum
 Aster oolentangiensis : Symphyotrichum oolentangiense var. oolentangiense
 Aster oregonensis ssp. californicus : Sericocarpus oregonensis var.  californicus
 Aster oregonensis ssp. oregonensis : Sericocarpus oregonensis var. oregonensis 
 Aster paludicola : Symphyotrichum spathulatum var. yosemitanum
 Aster paludosus : Eurybia paludosa
 Aster paniculatus : Symphyotrichum lanceolatum ssp. lanceolatum 
 Aster pansus : Symphyotrichum ericoides var. pansum  
 Aster patens : Symphyotrichum patens var. patens 
 Aster pauciflorus : Almutaster pauciflorus
 Aster peglerae : Afroaster peglerae
 Aster perelegans : Eucephalus elegans
 Aster perfoliatus : Afroaster perfoliatus 
 Aster pilosus : Symphyotrichum pilosum
 Aster pleiocephalus : Afroaster pleiocephalus
 Aster porteri : Symphyotrichum porteri
 Aster praealtus : Symphyotrichum praealtum var. praealtum
 Aster pseudobakerianus : Afroaster pseudobakerianus
 Aster ptarmicoides : Oligoneuron album 
 Aster puniceus : Symphyotrichum puniceum
 Aster radulinus : Eurybia radulina
 Aster sagittifolius : Symphyotrichum cordifolium
 Aster scaber : Doellingeria scaber
 Aster scopulorum : Ionactis alpina
 Aster sericeus : Symphyotrichum sericeum 
 Aster sibiricus : Eurybia sibirica 
 Aster simplex : Symphyotrichum lanceolatum ssp. lanceolatum 
 Aster siskiyouensis : Eucephalus glabratus
 Aster subspicatus var. grayi : Symphyotrichum subspicatum var. grayi 
 Aster subspicatus var. subspicatus : Symphyotrichum subspicatum var. subspicatum
 Aster tansaniensis : Afroaster tansaniensis
 Aster umbellatus : Doellingeria umbellata var. umbellata 
 Aster yukonensis : Symphyotrichum yukonense
 Aster zuluensis : Afroaster zuluensis

References 

 
Aster